The South African Railways Class 8B 4-8-0 of 1903 was a steam locomotive from the pre-Union era in Transvaal Colony.

In 1903, soon after its establishment, the Central South African Railways placed thirty Class 8-L2  Mastodon type steam locomotives in service. In 1912, when they were assimilated into the South African Railways, they were renumbered and designated Class 8B.

Central South African Railways
Upon the establishment of the Central South African Railways (CSAR) in July 1902, a month after the end of the Second Boer War, Chief Locomotive Superintendent P.A. Hyde became the custodian of a mixed bag of locomotives inherited from the Imperial Military Railways (IMR). Apart from those locomotives which had been acquired new by the IMR during the war, these included engines which originated with the Selati Railway, the Nederlandsche Zuid-Afrikaansche Spoorweg-Maatschappij (NZASM), the Pretoria-Pietersburg Railway (PPR) and the Oranje-Vrijstaat Gouwerment-Spoorwegen (OVGS).

Manufacturers
The comparatively small number of serviceable locomotives which were immediately available for service, compounded by the poor condition of many of the original NZASM, PPR, Selati and OVGS locomotives as well as an expected post-war increase in traffic, led to an order for thirty Cape 8th Class  steam locomotives from Neilson, Reid and Company.

They were built to the specifications of the 8th Class  Mastodon type designed by H.M. Beatty, the Chief Locomotive Superintendent of the Cape Government Railways (CGR) from 1896 to 1910, and were the first locomotives to be ordered under the CSAR administration. Since they differed from the Class 8-L1 which had been inherited from the IMR by being equipped with Drummond tubes, these locomotives were designated CSAR Class .

While they were being built, Neilson, Reid amalgamated with Dübs and Company and Sharp, Stewart and Company to form the North British Locomotive Company (NBL). As a result, the first ten of these locomotives, numbered in the range from 441 to 450, were delivered as built by Neilson, Reid, while the other twenty, numbered in the range from 451 to 470, were delivered as built by NBL, even though all the NBL locomotives were also built at the Hyde Park shops of the former Neilson, Reid.

Drummond tubes
When Hyde placed the order for these locomotives, he specified fireboxes equipped with Drummond water tubes. This involved the installation of crossing water tubes into the firebox, as featured on the London and South Western Railway's T9 Class and L11 Class, in an attempt to increase the heating surface area of the water, albeit at the cost of increased boiler complexity. The tubes were arranged in two clusters and angled to aid circulation. Visible exterior evidence of the presence of Drummond tubes was the two offset rectangular inspection covers attached to the sides of the firebox. They contained stay plugs, serving stays which extended through the tubes from cover to cover through the firebox.

The CGR had also experimented with Drummond tubes by modifying its 6th Class no. 286 and had found that the benefit in improved performance was minimal, while the tubes were inclined to leak and were difficult to maintain. Like the CGR, the CSAR soon learned that the increase in steaming capacity was not sufficient to warrant the additional initial cost and increased maintenance requirements.

Apart from the Drummond tubes, the locomotives differed from the Class  in a few particulars. Their coupling rods were "H" section instead of rectangular, while their crank pins were slightly larger.

South African Railways
When the Union of South Africa was established on 31 May 1910, the three Colonial government railways (CGR, Natal Government Railways and CSAR) were united under a single administration to control and administer the railways, ports and harbours of the Union. Although the South African Railways and Harbours came into existence in 1910, the actual classification and renumbering of all the rolling stock of the three constituent railways were only implemented with effect from 1 January 1912.

In 1912, these locomotives were renumbered in the range from 1132 to 1161 and designated  on the SAR.

The Class 8-L2 locomotives, together with the CSAR's Classes  and   Mastodon type locomotives and all the CGR's   Consolidations and  Mastodons were grouped into ten different sub-classes by the SAR. The  locomotives became SAR Classes 8 and 8A to 8F and the  locomotives became Classes 8X to 8Z.

Modifications
In the SAR era, the Drummond tubes were gradually removed as and when the boilers required repairs, but the locomotives retained their Class 8B designation.

During A.G. Watson's term as the Chief Mechanical Engineer (CME) of the SAR from 1929 to 1936, many of the Class 8 to Class 8F locomotives were equipped with superheated boilers, larger bore cylinders and either inside or outside admission piston valves.

Of the Class 8B locomotives, nine were equipped with superheating,  bore cylinders and outside admission piston valves, while retaining their Class 8B classification.

Six locomotives were equipped with superheating,  bore cylinders and inside admission piston valves and were reclassified to Class 8BW.

Service
In SAR service, the  Class 8 family of locomotives served on every system in the country and, in the 1920s, became the mainstay of motive power on many branch lines. Their final days were spent in shunting service. They were all withdrawn from service by 1972.

Works numbers
The Class 8B and 8BW builders, works numbers, renumbering and superheating modifications are listed in the table.

Illustration
The main picture is a scan of a c. 1935 post card, showing a SAR Class 8B, ex CSAR Class 8-L2, banking at the Waterval Boven tunnel. The pictures below illustrate unmodified locomotives with Drummond tubes as well as superheated locomotives with outside admission piston valves (no. 1155) and inside admission piston valves (no. 1153).

References

1540
1540
4-8-0 locomotives
2D locomotives
Neilson Reid locomotives
NBL locomotives
Cape gauge railway locomotives
Railway locomotives introduced in 1903
1903 in South Africa